Admiral Karambir Singh, PVSM, AVSM, ADC (born 3 November 1959), is a former flag officer of Indian Navy, who served as the 24th Chief of the Naval Staff (CNS). The "Grey Eagle" (senior-most serving naval aviator) of the Navy, he replaced Admiral Sunil Lanba as the CNS after his retirement on 31 May 2019. Prior to his ascension, Admiral Singh served as the Vice Chief of the Naval Staff and Flag Officer Commanding-in-Chief, Eastern Naval Command.

Early life and education 
Born on 3 November 1959 in Jalandhar, Punjab, Admiral Singh is a second generation military officer. He attended the Barnes School in Deolali, before joining the 56th course of the National Defence Academy, where he was in the Hunter Squadron. He is an alumnus of the Defence Services Staff College, Wellington and the College of Naval Warfare, Mumbai.

Career 

He was commissioned into the Indian Navy in July 1980 and earned his wings as a helicopter pilot in 1982. He has extensive experience with the HAL Chetak, Kamov Ka-25 and Kamov Ka-28 helicopters.

Singh has commanded the Coast Guard ship ICGS Chand Bibi, the corvette INS Vijaydurg, and the guided missile destroyers INS Rana and INS Delhi. He also served as the Fleet Operations Officer of the Western Fleet. Ashore, he served at Naval Headquarters as the Joint Director Naval Air Staff, and as Captain Air and Officer-in-Charge of the Naval Air Station at Mumbai. He was also a member of the Aircrew Instrument Rating and Categorisation Board (AIRCATS).

Flag rank
On promotion to flag rank, Singh was appointed as the Chief of Staff, Eastern Naval Command. His other important flag appointments include Chief of Staff of the Tri-Services Unified Command at Andaman & Nicobar Islands and as the Flag Officer Commanding Maharashtra and Gujarat Naval Area (FOMAG). As the Director General of Project Seabird, he stewarded the development of the Navy's new base at Karwar. He went on serve as the Deputy Chief of the Naval Staff, following which he was appointed as Vice Chief of Naval Staff.

He assumed office of the Flag Officer Commanding-in-Chief Eastern Naval Command on 31 October 2017, succeeding Vice Admiral Harish Bisht. In a career spanning close to 39 years, he has been awarded the Param Vishist Seva Medal and the Ati Vishist Seva Medal.

On 23 March 2019, the Government of India named him Chief of Naval Staff, superseding Vice Admiral Bimal Verma. He is the first helicopter pilot to have served as Chief of Staff of the Indian Navy.

He superannuated on 30 November 2021, and was succeeded as Chief of Naval Staff by Vice Admiral R. Hari Kumar.

Bi-lateral visits as CNS

Awards and decorations

References

Living people
Chiefs of the Naval Staff (India)
Vice Chiefs of Naval Staff (India)
Deputy Chiefs of Naval Staff (India)
Indian Navy admirals
Recipients of the Ati Vishisht Seva Medal
Recipients of the Param Vishisht Seva Medal
1959 births
National Defence Academy (India) alumni
Indian naval aviators
Defence Services Staff College alumni